William Kennedy (17 July 1859 – 1918) was a Scottish painter associated with the Glasgow School.

Biography

William Kennedy was born in Hutchesontown, Glasgow on 17 July 1859, and attended the Paisley School of Art.  In the early 1880s he moved to Paris, where he attended the Académie Julian and studied with artists such as Jules Bastien-Lepage, William-Adolphe Bouguereau, Raphaël Collin, Gustave-Claude-Etienne Courtois, and Tony Robert-Fleury.

He established a studio in Stirling and painted rural landscapes, as well as boldly-colored depictions of Highland soldiers at Stirling Castle.

Kennedy became a prominent member of a group of artists known as the Glasgow Boys.  In 1887 he was elected president of a society formed by the group's members.

He moved to Berkshire in the 1890s, and married fellow painter Lena Scott in 1898. He moved to Tangier in 1912, for health reasons. While living there, his art featured scenes from Moorish life. He died in 1918.

References

External links

 

1859 births
1918 deaths
Artists from Paisley, Renfrewshire
Académie Julian alumni
19th-century Scottish painters
Scottish male painters
20th-century Scottish painters
Glasgow School
People from Gorbals
19th-century Scottish male artists
20th-century Scottish male artists